Jesendorf is a municipality in the Nordwestmecklenburg district, in Mecklenburg-Vorpommern, Germany

References

Nordwestmecklenburg